Ophichthus retrodorsalis is an eel in the family Ophichthidae (worm/snake eels). 
It is found along the Pacific coast of China.

References

retrodorsalis
Fish of China
Taxa named by Dong Liu (biologist)
Taxa named by Tang Wen-Qiao
Taxa named by Zhang Chun-Guang
Fish described in 2010